Alibeyköy Cep Bus Terminal (Turkish: Alibeyköy Cep Otogarı), is Istanbul's second most used bus terminal, behind Esenler Coach Terminal. The bus terminal was opened in January 2014 and is further away from the city. The terminal is on the European side of Istanbul in the Eyüpsultan district. The terminal had 108 platforms when it was built, but its number was increased to 110 in 2018. On average around 700–800 buses go in and out every day. The management of the bus terminal is done by ISPARK. BELTUR also has a cafe in the terminal.

Connections 

In 2021, the first section of the Eminönü-Alibeyköy tram line consisting of 12 stations (Cibali-Alibeyköy Bus Terminal) was opened with a ceremony and the T5 line's test drive was live streamed on Ekrem İmamoğlu's YouTube channel.

There is also the Alibeyköy Metro Station that was opened in October 2020 and is 1,7 km away from the bus terminal.

47A, 47L, 48A, 49GB, 49Z bus lines also stop at the station.

References 

Buildings and structures in Istanbul
Bus stations in Turkey
Public transport in Istanbul
Transit centers in Istanbul